The Christian Foundation for the Blind in Thailand (CFBT) is a non-profit charitable organization helping blind people and employing staff in Thailand regardless of gender, race or religion. It was founded in 1978 by Prayat Punong-ong, a blind man who taught 13 blind children in a rental house in Khon Kaen Province.

CFBT declares its mission to provide professional services and management to the visually impaired, improving their quality of life and helping them to live in harmony with themselves and other people.

Vision
Blind persons living normally and equally with other people in the society

Philosophy
Lives start with chance

Missions
Nurture of blind people in living skills, education and vocation to their potential, maintaining transparent governance and management that are acceptable globally, promoting accessibility and conserving good culture

Objectives
Promotion of education, job training, job placement and research for visually impaired persons
Provision of inclusive education and non-formal education in all levels of education for visually impaired persons
Promotion of moral improvement in visually impaired persons
Promotion of visually impaired students to attend public schools and colleges at all levels of education
Production, provision and services of materials and equipment for education, occupation and independent living of visually impaired persons 
Joining hands with other agencies which have similar objectives for public welfare
Not participating in any campaign activity for or against political candidates

History
1978 - Following a hard-earned chance to college education, Prayat Punong-ong, 29, a blind man with bachelor's degree of Education in English Major, returned to his hometown in Khon Kaen with great passion to help other blind children get their chance to education so that they could live independently. The idea that blind people can be educated for independent living was not a common belief in Thai society at that time. Most blind people were found begging in public places or left stranded at home to eat, breathe and do nothing until they die. Those pictures were planted in Prayat's mind before he became totally blind at the age of 8 by a road accident, and that inspired him to make a difference. Prayat and his wife, Bantom (later changed to Thidarat), started their mission by renting half of a house in Soi Tarn Thip, Khon Kaen and established the Christian Home for Education of the Blind to train blind students basic living, traveling, reading-writing and all required skills to be ready for normal education systems. At the start on 2 December, 13 blind students were provided free accommodation, food and training funded with all the money the couple had plus initial donation of 10,082 THB from Mrs. Rose Lim, a Singaporean, and 12 beds donated by World Vision Foundation of Thailand. Prayat took care of living skill and academic skill training for the blind while Bantom shared duty as guide, housemate, administrator and teacher of moral and music. They earned a little food and money by singing and begging for help from donors in the community.
1979 - The board of directors was formed. inclusive education started for the first time with 3 students attending Khon Kaen Christian School and Sanam Bin School, private and governmental schools respectively. To provide effective education, teachers, parents, caretaker of student and community were trained to support the students properly. Bantome was the first teacher for inclusive education for the blind at Sanam Bin School.
1980 - The success had become better recognized publicly, bringing passionate supports from Thailand and overseas. Mr. Burin Burittrakul, a wealthy businessman in Khon Kaen, donated a land sized 8.5 Rai (136 hectares) for building Khon Kaen School for the Blind, and Evangelical Church of Bangkok donated cash to buy additional 3.5 Rai (56 hectares) area totaling 12 Rai (192 hectares). The construction began with help from Faculty of Engineering, Khon Kaen University and donations from Canadian government and Christoffel Blinden Mission, Germany.
1981 - The first school building finished in August, and the fellows moved in from the old rented house.
1983 - The Christian Foundation for the Blind in Thailand; CFBT was recognized by Office of the National Culture Commission; ONCC on 23 September and registered by Khon Kaen’s official on 29 November.
1984 - The foundation was gracefully granted the royal patronage of His Majesty the King on 3 June bringing much greater support and recognition countrywide that resulted in expanding the service for the blind to many branch offices throughout Thailand.
1985 - Despite resistance from the management board, Prayat with his wife and some school staffs led 40 blind students in a 450 km walkathon from Khon Kaen to Bangkok as a symbolic movement to get attention from the government and public about the right to development and education for the blind. They set off on 24 October and arrived at Chatuchak Park, Bangkok on 3 November receiving great attention from domestic media and raised a few million Baht to start the service in Bangkok. Prayat used that money to by an abandoned house in Bangkhen District with a brave plan to start a nursing home for blind children with multiple disabilities. Although his action was criticized as a waste of effort by some board members, Prayat insisted and commented, "State-run shelters for these disabled children do not have enough resources, both in terms of budget and staff, to allow them to develop properly. They need the private sector to help relieve the heavy burden."
1986 - The nursing home for blind children with multiple disabilities started service and later became known as Home for the Blind with Multiple Disabilities providing free accommodation and food for blind children with dedicated caretakers and rehabilitation staff. The work on blind children with multiple disabilities astoundingly attracted visitors and donors in Bangkok and other provinces contributing to majority portion of donation for the whole CFBT until now.
1988 - CFBT was recognized as a public welfare organization number 174 by Ministry of Finance. Money donations became tax deductible.
1989 - Started operation of Nakhon Ratchasima School for the Blind and Education Service Center for the Blind. H.R.H. Princess Sirindhorn gracefully chaired the grand opening ceremony of Nakhon Ratchasima Education Service Center for the Blind on 14 March 1990.
1993 - Started operation of Roi-et Rehabilitation Center for the Blind. H.R.H. Princess Sirindhorn gracefully chaired the grand opening ceremony of Roi-et School for the Blind on 5 February 1995.
1994 - Started operation of Lampang Rehabilitation Center for the Blind. H.R.H. Princess Sirindhorn gracefully chaired the grand opening ceremony of Lampang Development Center for the Blind and Lampang School for the Blind on 11 March 1997. This center is currently under the Lampang Eye Foundation.
1998 - Started operation of Lopburi School for the Blind and the Blind with Multiple Disabilities. H.R.H. Princess Sirindhorn gracefully chaired the grand opening ceremony on 30 January 2002.
2004 - Started operation of Hat Yai Dhamma Sakon School for the Blind, Songkla. H.R.H. Princess Sirindhorn gracefully chaired the grand opening ceremony on 5 February 2007.
2006 - Started operation of Science School for the Blind in Khao Yoi, Phetchaburi. H.R.H. Princess Sirindhorn gracefully named and chaired the grand opening ceremony of Dhammika Wittaya School on 8 August 2009.
2008 - Started operation of North-eastern Vocational Training Center for the Blind in Kai Na District, Khon Kaen.
2009 - Home for the Blind with Multiple Disabilities was transformed to a school for development of blind children with multiple disabilities to emphasize on developing them to their full potential, and it was renamed as a school. H.R.H. Princess Srirasm, the Royal Consort to the Crown Prince of Thailand, gracefully chaired the grand opening of Ban Dek Ramindra School on 2 June 2009.
2009 - Started operation of Nakhon Nayok Vocational Development Center for the Blind with Multiple Disabilities. H.R.H. Princess Sirindhorn gracefully chaired the grand opening ceremony on 14 May 2014.
2013 - Started construction of Cha-am School for Deaf Blind Children in Cha-am District, Phetchaburi Province.
2014 - Started construction of Mae Sai School for the Blind in Mae Sai District, Chiang Rai Province.

Branches and Service Centers
CFBT has 1 headquarter and 9 branches where in total 8 schools and 5 service centers are operated plus 2 schools under construction.
CFBT Headquarter, Isan Region, Khon Kaen Province
Administrative Center of CFBT, Khon Kaen 
Educational Technology Center for the Blind (ETCB), Khon Kaen 
Benyalai Electronic Library, Nakhon Ratchasima  
Disabled Student Services (DSS), Bangkok 
CFBT Bangkok, Central Thailand, Bangkok Province
Ban Dek Ramindra School (Home for the Blind with Multiple Disabilities), Bangkok 
CFBT Lopburi, Central Thailand, Lopburi Province
Lopburi School for the Blind and the Blind with Multiple Disabilities, Lopburi 
CFBT Phetchaburi, Central Thailand, Phetchaburi Province
Dhammika Wittaya School (Academic School for the Blind), Phetchaburi 
Cha-am School for the Blind (expected to start service in 2015) 
CFBT Nakhon Nayok, Central Thailand, Nakhon Nayok Province
Nakhon Nayok Vocational Development Center for the Blind with Multiple Disabilities Nakhon Nayok 
CFBT Khon Kaen, Isan Region, Khon Kaen Province
Khon Kaen School for the Blind, Khon Kaen 
North-eastern Vocational Training Center for the Blind (VTC), Khon Kaen 
CFBT Nakon Ratchasima, Isan Region, Nakhon Ratchasima Province
Nakhon Ratchasima School for the Blind and Education Service Center for the Blind, Nakhon Ratchasima 
CFBT Roi Et, Isan Region, Roi Et Province
Roi Et School for the Blind, Roi Et 
CFBT Songkhla, South Thailand, Songkhla Province
Hat Yai Dhammasakol School for the Blind, Songkhla 
CFBT Lampang (currently under the Lampang Eye Foundation), North Thailand, Lampang Province
Lampang Development Center for the Blind and Lampang School for the Blind 
CFBT Chiang Rai, North Thailand, Chiang Rai Province
Mae Sai School for the Blind (expected to start service in 2015)

Programs
CFBT supports more than 4,000 blind children and young adults a year through the following programs:
 Dormitory
 Preparatory education program
 Inclusive education program
 Rehabilitation and re-Integration
 Scholarship for blind students
 Job placement assistance for the blind
 Community based rehabilitation (CBR)
 Research and development of assistive technology for the blind
 Production of Braille and talking books
 Training and services on assistive technology for visually impaired people

It is a member of the Thailand National Committee on DAISY Production and Services (TNCD).

References

Blindness organizations
Religious organizations based in Thailand
Organizations established in 1978
1978 establishments in Thailand
Disability organizations based in Thailand